Gabbar Poonchwala is an Indian sitcom which premiered on Disney Channel India from 11 January 2016 to 4 April 2016. The story is about a dog, Gabbar, who can speak Haryanvi with the boy called Mihir who found him in the playground. It aired on 11 January 2016.

Characters 
 Akash Dhanija as Gabbar "Poonchwala" (Voice role)
 Nihar Gite as Mihir Khanna
 Sanjeev Rathore as Sunil Khanna, Father of Mihir
 Eva Shirali as Gauri Khanna, Mother of Mihir
 Sharad Joshi as Amar Khanna, Elder Brother of Mihir
 Pankaj Kansra as Dimple Aunty, Neighbour and mother of Sanya
 Tunisha Sharma as Sanya, Amar's Girlfriend & Dimple aunty's Daughter.)
 Hitesh Dave as Maharaj 
Ritesh M M Shukla as Bhola

References 

2016 Indian television series debuts
2016 Indian television series endings
Talking animals in fiction
Television shows about dogs
Disney Channel (Indian TV channel) original programming